The Southern Maryland Electric Cooperative (SMECO) is an electric distribution cooperative which is headquartered in Hughesville, Maryland, United States. SMECO serves approximately 161,000 customers in Calvert, Charles, Prince George's, and St. Mary's counties of southern Maryland. Under its rules as a nonprofit cooperative, SMECO passes on its costs to its customer-members without markup or profit.

History
In 1937 two committees of citizens from three counties which were seeking aid to construct a local rural electric distribution system under the New Deal's Rural Electrictrification Administration formed the Southern Maryland Tri-County Electric Cooperative Association. This was reorganized as a cooperative under the SMECO name in 1942. Customers were allowed to select suppliers of electricity beginning in 2001 under the Maryland Electric Deregulation legislation enacted in 1999. From 2007 to 2011, SMECO has won the J.D. Power and Associates award for best customer service for a midsize utility.

SMECO owned a 77 MW gas turbine generator located at the Chalk Point Generating Station which began operation in 1990 and was operated and maintained by NRG Energy. In 2015 NRG acquired the turbine plant from SMECO.

FERC solar complaint 
SMECO has filed a complaint with the US Federal Energy Regulatory Commission (FERC), alleging that the Maryland Public Service Commission (PSC) coerced utilities into purchasing excess solar power generated by the state's community solar program at much higher retail rates rather than paying the amount it would have cost these utilities to create the power themselves, also known as the avoided cost. This would be in violation with the federal Public Utility Regulatory Policies Act (PURPA), which establishes that any payment given to such qualifying power plants equate the utility's avoided cost. In addition, PURPA mandates that these plants do not exceed 80 MW of power.

Recently, the development of community solar programs has become increasingly prevalent in order to meet the ever-growing demand for new, viable energy sources; however, there has been much controversy regarding the surge in net metering consumers due to the resulting cost shifts which negatively affect the non-solar community now facing much higher payments to even out the increased benefits given to solar projects.

Because of the continual reduction in the cost of power, FERC has become more concerned with the discrepancy between avoided costs and wholesale prices, which continue to prevail. This has placed more focus on PURPA's roles and responsibilities in the maintenance and balance of the current energy market.

References

External links
 

Companies based in Maryland
Electric power companies of the United States
Electric generation and transmission cooperatives in the United States
Charles County, Maryland
Energy companies established in 1937
1937 establishments in Maryland